Alexander 'Sandy' Victor Smith (born 11 May 1945) is a former Irish first-class cricketer.

Smith was born at Shanganagh near Shankill, and was educated in Bray at Saint Brendan's College. Playing his club cricket for Pembroke, he made his debut for Ireland in a minor match against Wales at Swansea in 1977. The following year he made his debut in first-class cricket, when Ireland played Scotland at Glasgow. The following season, he made a second first-class appearance against the touring Sri Lankans at Eglinton. He continued to play club cricket for Pembroke into the 1980s. Outside of cricket, his profession was an accountant.

References

External links
 

1945 births
Living people
Cricketers from Dublin (city)
Irish cricketers
Irish accountants